Lucas Lopes de Freitas (born October 5, 1979) is a Brazilian mixed martial artist. A professional since 1999, he has competed for Strikeforce, Shooto, and Titan FC.

Mixed martial arts

Early career
Lopes made his professional debut in 1999, compiling a record of 21-8 before being signed by Strikeforce.

Strikeforce
Lopes made his promotional debut at Strikeforce: Lawler vs. Shields on June 6, 2009, facing 12-5-1 Scott Ventimiglia. He won via disqualification.

He later returned at Strikeforce Challengers 5 against Dominic Brown. Lopes won via second-round TKO.

In 2010, Lopes returned against Cortez Coleman at Strikeforce: Henderson vs. Babalu. He lost via first-round submission. 

|-
| Loss
| align=center| 29-20
| DeWayne Diggs
| TKO (punches)
| Shamrock FC 222
| 
| align=center| 1
| align=center| 1:09
| St. Louis, Missouri, United States
| 
|-
| Loss
| align=center| 29-19
| Keith Smetana
| Submission (rear-naked choke)
| Shamrock Promotions: Force
| 
| align=center| 1
| align=center| 1:30
| St. Louis, Missouri, United States
| 
|-
| Loss
| align=center| 29-18
| Dustin Jacoby
| TKO (head kick and punches)
| TFC 29: Titan Fighting Championship 29
| 
| align=center| 1
| align=center| 4:15
| Fayetteville, North Carolina, United States
| 
|-
| Win
| align=center| 29-17
| Brian Grinnell
| Submission
| XFL: Rumble on the River 8
| 
| align=center| 1
| align=center| 4:03
| Tulsa, Oklahoma, United States
| 
|-
| Win
| align=center| 28-17
| George Altamirano
| TKO (punches)
| RDC MMA: Reto de Campeones MMA
| 
| align=center| 1
| align=center| 0:40
| Mexico City, Mexico
| 
|-
| Loss
| align=center| 27-17
| Sergio Fernandes
| Submission (rear-naked choke)
| HFR 3: High Fight Rock 3
| 
| align=center| 2
| align=center| 0:00
| Anápolis, Goiás, Brazil
| 
|-
| Loss
| align=center| 27-16
| Dan McGlasson
| TKO (punches)
| Shamrock Promotions: Fight Night
| 
| align=center| 1
| align=center| 4:44
| St. Louis, Missouri, United States
| 
|-
| Win
| align=center| 27-15
| Petras Markevicius
| Submission (kneebar)
| Flawless FC 2: Hated
| 
| align=center| 1
| align=center| 0:54
| Chicago, Illinois, United States
| 
|-
| Loss
| align=center| 26-15
| Leo Pla
| Decision (split)
| Shamrock Promotions: Legacy
| 
| align=center| 3
| align=center| 5:00
| St. Louis, Missouri, United States
| 
|-
| Win
| align=center| 26-14
| Kalel Robinson
| Submission (armbar)
| Shamrock Promotions: Chaos
| 
| align=center| 1
| align=center| 2:11
| St. Louis, Missouri, United States
| 
|-
| Loss
| align=center| 25-14
| Sam Alvey
| TKO (punches)
| SF: ShoFight 20
| 
| align=center| 1
| align=center| 1:39
| Springfield, Missouri, United States
| 
|-
| Win
| align=center| 25-13
| Eddie Larrea
| Submission (armbar)
| Shamrock Promotions: Fight Night
| 
| align=center| 1
| align=center| 1:14
| St. Louis, Missouri, United States
| 
|-
| Loss
| align=center| 24-13
| Chuck Parmelee
| KO (punch)
| Fight Me MMA: Trujillo vs. Gwaltney
| 
| align=center| 1
| align=center| 0:42
| St. Charles, Missouri, United States
| 
|-
| Loss
| align=center| 24-12
| Mike Bronzoulis
| Decision (unanimous)
| Shark Fights 14: Horwich vs. Villefort
| 
| align=center| 3
| align=center| 5:00
| Lubbock, Texas, United States
| 
|-
| Loss
| align=center| 24-11
| Cortez Coleman
| Submission (guillotine choke)
| Strikeforce: Henderson vs. Babalu II
| 
| align=center| 1
| align=center| 2:04
| St. Louis, Missouri, United States
| 
|-
| Loss
| align=center| 24-10
| Brendan Seguin
| TKO (retirement)
| Fight Me MMA 1: The Battle Begins
| 
| align=center| 1
| align=center| 5:00
| St. Charles, Missouri, United States
| 
|-
| Loss
| align=center| 24-9
| Billy Horne
| Submission (rear-naked choke)
| MMA Big Show: All or Nothing
| 
| align=center| 1
| align=center| 4:10
| Indiana, United States
| 
|-
| Win
| align=center| 24-8
| Bubba McDaniel
| KO (punches)
| MMA Big Show: A Prodigy Returns
| 
| align=center| 1
| align=center| 2:13
| Florence, Indiana, United States
| 
|-
| Win
| align=center| 23-8
| Dominic Brown
| TKO (punches)
| Strikeforce Challengers: Woodley vs. Bears
| 
| align=center| 2
| align=center| 0:45
| Kansas City, Kansas, United States
| 
|-
| Win
| align=center| 22-8
| Scott Ventimiglia
| DQ (illegal knee)
| Strikeforce: Lawler vs. Shields
| 
| align=center| 1
| align=center| 3:26
| St. Louis, Missouri, United States
| 
|-
| Win
| align=center| 21-8
| Herbert Goodman
| Decision (unanimous)
| HP: The Patriot Act 2
| 
| align=center| 3
| align=center| 5:00
| Columbia, Missouri, United States
| 
|-
| Win
| align=center| 20-8
| Andre Castanhal
| TKO (punches)
| SVT: Para vs. Northeast
| 
| align=center| 3
| align=center| 1:51
| Belém, Pará, Brazil
| 
|-
| Loss
| align=center| 19-8
| Valter Roberto de Menezes
| Submission (arm triangle choke)
| RF 4: Real Fight 4
| 
| align=center| 2
| align=center| 4:02
| São José dos Campos, São Paulo, Brazil
| 
|-
| Win
| align=center| 19-7
| Joao Vicente Santiago Jr.
| Submission (triangle choke)
| Leal Combat: Natal
| 
| align=center| 1
| align=center| 1:45
| Rio Grande do Norte, Brazil
| 
|-
| Win
| align=center| 18-7
| Zeca Doido
| TKO (punches)
| Shock Fight: Vale Tudo
| 
| align=center| 3
| align=center| 2:11
| João Pessoa, Paraíba, Brazil
| 
|-
| Win
| align=center| 17-7
| Anderson Cruz
| Submission (punches)
| NCC: Nordeste Combat Championship
| 
| align=center| 1
| align=center| 1:45
| Rio Grande do Norte, Brazil
| 
|-
| Loss
| align=center| 16-7
| Sean Salmon
| Submission
| FF 6: Fightfest 6
| 
| align=center| 2
| align=center| 2:44
| Corpus Christi, Texas, United States
| 
|-
| Win
| align=center| 16-6
| Wayne Cole
| TKO (corner stoppage)
| DPP: September to Remember
| 
| align=center| 2
| align=center| 5:00
| Lafayette, Louisiana, United States
| 
|-
| Win
| align=center| 15-6
| Todd Seyler
| Submission
| FF 4: Fightfest 4
| 
| align=center| 1
| align=center| 1:05
| Corpus Christi, Texas, United States
| 
|-
| Loss
| align=center| 14-6
| Ron Fields
| Decision (unanimous)
| BATB: Battle at the Boardwalk (Day 1)
| 
| align=center| 3
| align=center| 5:00
| Atlantic City, New Jersey, United States
| 
|-
| Win
| align=center| 14-5
| Scott Harper
| Submission (arm triangle choke)
| FT 6: Full Throttle 6
| 
| align=center| 1
| align=center| 3:44
| Atlanta, Georgia, United States
| 
|-
| Loss
| align=center| 13-5
| Seth Kleinbeck
| TKO (punches)
| FT 5: Full Throttle 5
| 
| align=center| 1
| align=center| 3:12
| Georgia, United States
| 
|-
| Win
| align=center| 13-4
| Samuel Gaskins
| KO (punches)
| Shooto: Battle at the Ballpark 2
| 
| align=center| 1
| align=center| 0:58
| St. Louis, Missouri, United States
| 
|-
| Win
| align=center| 12-4
| Sydney Machado
| Decision
| Costa Rica: Fights 1
| 
| align=center| 0
| align=center| 0:00
| Costa Rica
| 
|-
| Loss
| align=center| 11-4
| Adriano Martins
| Decision (unanimous)
| GOTJ: Gladiator of the Jungle 1
| 
| align=center| 1
| align=center| 10:00
| Manaus, Brazil
| 
|-
| Win
| align=center| 11-3
| Waldir dos Anjos
| TKO (doctor stoppage)
| GVTO: Garra Vale Tudo Open 3
| 
| align=center| 1
| align=center| 4:07
| Aracaju, Sergipe, Brazil
| 
|-
| Loss
| align=center| 10-3
| Evangelista Santos
| TKO (punches and leg kick)
| Jungle Fight 1
| 
| align=center| 2
| align=center| 4:08
| Manaus, Brazil
| 
|-
| Win
| align=center| 10-2
| Antonio Mendes
| TKO (cut)
| BC: Bitetti Combat Nordeste 2
| 
| align=center| 2
| align=center| N/A
| Rio Grande do Norte, Brazil
| 
|-
| Loss
| align=center| 9-2
| Jorge Magalhaes
| Decision (split)
| BC: Bitetti Combat Nordeste 1
| 
| align=center| 3
| align=center| 5:00
| Rio Grande do Norte, Brazil
| 
|-
| Loss
| align=center| 9-1
| Nilson de Castro
| TKO (strikes)
| Meca 7: Meca World Vale Tudo 7
| 
| align=center| 1
| align=center| 7:00
| Curitiba, Parana, Brazil
| 
|-
| Win
| align=center| 9-0
| Luis Mello
| Submission
| CN 5: Champions Night 5
| 
| align=center| 1
| align=center| 0:00
| Ceará, Brazil
| 
|-
| Win
| align=center| 8-0
| Andre Cardoso
| TKO (knees)
| GVTO: Garra Vale Tudo Open 2
| 
| align=center| 1
| align=center| 2:39
| Aracaju, Sergipe, Brazil
| 
|-
| Win
| align=center| 7-0
| Thiago Alves
| Decision (unanimous)
| X: Fight
| 
| align=center| 3
| align=center| 5:00
| João Pessoa, Paraíba, Brazil
| 
|-
| Win
| align=center| 6-0
| Ronald Vasconselos
| TKO (punches)
| CN: Champions Night 2
| 
| align=center| 1
| align=center| 1:30
| Ceará, Brazil
| 
|-
| Win
| align=center| 5-0
| Reginaldo Silva
| TKO (punches)
| WVC 13: World Vale Tudo Championship 13
| 
| align=center| 1
| align=center| 2:25
| Pernambuco, Brazil
| 
|-
| Win
| align=center| 4-0
| Almir Trator
| KO (punch)
| SPVTC: Serido Professional Vale Tudo Circuit 3
| 
| align=center| 1
| align=center| 3:49
| Rio Grande do Norte, Brazil
| 
|-
| Win
| align=center| 3-0
| Breno Breno
| KO (punch)
| CNVTO: Currais Novos Vale Tudo Open
| 
| align=center| 1
| align=center| 1:27
| Rio Grande do Norte, Brazil
| 
|-
| Win
| align=center| 2-0
| Marcelo de Oliveira
| Decision (unanimous)
| AFC: Asekan Freestyle Cup
| 
| align=center| 3
| align=center| 5:00
| Ceará, Brazil
| 
|-
| Win
| align=center| 1-0
| Jalmir Ferreira
| Submission (guillotine choke)
| CNVTO: Currais Novos Vale Tudo Open
| 
| align=center| 3
| align=center| 0:46
| Rio Grande do Norte, Brazil
|

See also
List of male mixed martial artists

References

External links
 
 
 
 
 

1979 births
Brazilian male mixed martial artists
Welterweight mixed martial artists
Middleweight mixed martial artists
Light heavyweight mixed martial artists
Living people